Paul Lambert (born July 12, 1950) is an American politician who was a member of the unicameral Nebraska Legislature. He was born in Omaha, Nebraska and resides in Plattsmouth, Nebraska. 

Early life
Lambert graduated from Nehawka High School and attended Wayne State College and the University of Omaha.  Prior to his appointment to the legislature, he was first a member of the city council and then mayor of Plattsmouth, Nebraska.

State legislature
Lambert was appointed in 2011 to represent the 2nd Nebraska legislative district to replace Dave Pankonin, who resigned. He sat on the General Affairs, Health and Human Services, Nebraska Retirement Systems, and Urban Affairs committees.  Although he won the primary, he lost to Bill Kintner in the 2012 general election.

See also

 Nebraska Legislature

References

 

1950 births
Living people
Politicians from Omaha, Nebraska
Republican Party Nebraska state senators
People from Plattsmouth, Nebraska